The Sound of Violence is Bahraini thrash metal band Motör Militia's debut album, and is the first album of its genre to be released by a Middle Eastern group on an independent label.

Influenced stylistically by 1980s thrash metal, particularly Slayer and Metallica, the album was recorded in Salmabad, Bahrain—an industrial district more akin to forging steel than to recording studios.  Regardless, the band recorded eight songs between June and July 2004.

Taking the DIY ethic to heart, the band put together fifty CD packages by hand—with their record company providing the cases and other components.  They were all subsequently sold at Friendly Violent Fun 3, another DIY concert organized by members of the band, as well as other bands in the Bahraini heavy metal music community.

Track listing

 "End of Days" – 04:04(Music: Abdulla - Lyrics: Abdulla / Muijrers)
 "Ignorance" – 03:55(Music & Lyrics: Abdulla)
 "Fame. Fortune. Flesh." – 04:44(Music: Hatlani / Abdulla - Lyrics: Abdulla)
 "Shattered Dream"  – 03:59(Music: Abdulla / Hatlani - Lyrics: Abdulla)
 "Hole"  – 05:29(Music: Abdulla / Muijrers / Hatlani - Lyrics: Abdulla / Muijrers)
 "Wrath of Violence"  – 04:34(Music & Lyrics: Abdulla)
 "Sins of Man"  – 04:34(Music: Hatlani - Lyrics: Abdulla)
 "Nuclear Winter"  – 05:52(Music: Hatlani - Lyrics: Muijrers)

Personnel
 Mahmood Abdulla – vocals, Bass
 Yousef Hatlani – guitars
 Abdulla Muijrers – drums

References

External links
 Video of the band recording in Hilwan Studios @ YouTube

2004 debut albums
Motör Militia albums